The 1971 European Figure Skating Championships was a senior-level international competition held at the Hallenstadion in Zürich, Switzerland on February 2–7. Elite senior-level figure skaters from European ISU member nations competed for the title of European Champion in the disciplines of men's singles, ladies' singles, pair skating, and ice dancing.

The pair skating event demonstrated the dominance of the Soviet Union in this discipline. Irina Rodnina and Alexei Ulanov took the title in spite of a fall by Ulanov on a double Axel, a side-by-side jump not being attempted by any other team.

The ice dance competition was a contrast between the British and Russian styles of dance. British-trained Angelika and Erich Buck narrowly lost a 5–4 decision to Liudmila Pakhomova and Alexandr Gorshkov, who as usual were criticized for their unequal balance of skills.

Ondrej Nepela ran away with the men's title following the withdrawal of his two top challengers, Patrick Péra and Gunter Zoller, due to injuries. Nepela's victory was more the result of his strong showing in the compulsory figures than for his rather undistinguished free skating. The free skating portion of the competition was won by Haig Oundjian, who landed triple toe loop and triple salchow jumps and moved up from 6th after the figures to take the bronze medal.

The ladies event was likewise decided by the compulsory figures as Beatrix Schuba dominated that part of the competition. The free skating was won by Sonja Morgenstern, who landed a triple salchow jump in her program—at that time it was very rare for women to attempt triple jumps. Morgenstern had placed a distant 8th in the figures. Schuba was heavily criticized for the poor quality of her free skating, which included a fall on a relatively simple double loop as well as a definite underrotation on her double Axel.

Results

Men

Ladies

Pairs

Ice dancing

References

Sources
 "Europeans", Skating magazine, Apr 1971

External links
 results

European Figure Skating Championships, 1971
European Figure Skating Championships, 1971
European Figure Skating Championships
International figure skating competitions hosted by Switzerland
Sports competitions in Zürich
20th century in Zürich
European Figure Skating Championships